William Adam Swiacki (October 2, 1922 – July 7, 1976) was an American football player and coach.  He played college football as an end for Columbia University in 1946 and 1947 and was a consensus first-team All-American in 1947.  He played professional football in the National Football League (NFL) for the New York Giants from 1948 to 1950 and for the Detroit Lions in 1951 and 1952.  He was a member of the Lions' 1952 team that won the NFL championship.

Early years
Swiacki was born in Southbridge, Massachusetts, in 1922. He was of Polish descent

College football and military service
Swiacki began his college education at the College of the Holy Cross in Worcester, Massachusetts. He played at the end position for the Holy Cross Crusaders football team in 1942.  He then served as a second lieutenant and navigator on a B-17 Flying Fortress in the United States Army Air Forces during World War II. After the war, he attended Columbia University and played college football at the end position for the Columbia Lions in 1946 and 1947. On October 26, 1947, Swiacki gained national fame when his nine pass receptions led Columbia to a 21-20 victory over Army, breaking the Cadets' 32-game winning streak. At the end of the 1947 season, Swiacki was a consensus All-American, receiving first-team honors from, among others, the American Football Coaches Association, the Associated Press, the United Press, Collier's Weekly, the International News Service, and the Newspaper Enterprise Association.

Professional football
He later played professional football in the National Football League (NFL) as an end for the New York Giants from 1948 to 1950 and for the Detroit Lions from 1951 to 1952. He was a member of the 1952 Detroit Lions team that won the NFL championship.   In September 1953, Swiacki announced that he was retiring from football to devote his time to business in his hometown of Southbridge, Massachusetts. In five years in the NFL, Swiacki appeared in 59 games and caught 139 passes for 1,883 yards for 18 touchdowns.

Coaching career
In May 1954, Swiacki was hired as the end coach for the New York Giants. In May 1955, he was hired as the head coach for the Toronto Argonauts. After two seasons with the Argonauts, Swiacki quit the job in November 1956.

Family and later years
After retiring from football, Swiacki returned to Massachusetts and went into the real estate business.  He and his wife, Charlotte Lester Swiacki (1926-1999), had a son, Bill, Jr., and a daughter, Leslie.  Bill, Jr., was a standout three-sport athlete at Amherst College who was drafted by both the NFL's New York Giants and Major League Baseball's Los Angeles Dodgers.

Swiacki was named to the College Football Hall of Fame in April 1976.  Less than three months later, 9n July 1976, Swiacki died at his home in Sturbridge, Massachusetts, at age 53. He was killed when his rifle accidentally discharged while Swiacki was cleaning it in the basement of his home.

References

External links

 

1922 births
1976 deaths
American football ends
Holy Cross Crusaders football players
Columbia Lions football players
Detroit Lions players
Los Angeles Rams coaches
New York Giants players
Toronto Argonauts coaches
All-American college football players
College Football Hall of Fame inductees
People from Southbridge, Massachusetts
Sportspeople from Worcester County, Massachusetts
Players of American football from Massachusetts
United States Army Air Forces personnel of World War II
United States Army Air Forces officers
Military personnel from Massachusetts